The Europe/Africa Zone was one of three groups of Davis Cup competition in 2005.

Group I

Group II

Georgia, Monaco, Estonia, and Côte d'Ivoire relegated to Group III in 2006.
Ukraine and Portugal promoted to Group I in 2006.

Group III

Venue 1
Venue: Smash Tennis Academy, Cairo, Egypt (clay)
Date: 27 April – 1 May

(scores in italics carried over)

FYR Macedonia and Egypt promoted to Group II in 2006.
Madagascar and Kenya relegated to Group IV in 2006.

Venue 2
Venue: Fitzwilliam Tennis Club, Dublin, Ireland (grass)
Date: 13–17 July

(scores in italics carried over)

Cyprus and Ireland promoted to Group II in 2006.
Iceland and San Marino relegated to Group IV in 2006.

Group IV
Venue: Lugogo Tennis Club, Kampala, Uganda (clay)
Date: Week of 28 February

 Moldova, Andorra, Botswana and Rwanda promoted to Group III in 2006.

See also
Davis Cup structure

References

 
Europe Africa
Davis Cup Europe/Africa Zone